Rosthern-Shellbrook is a provincial electoral district for the Legislative Assembly of Saskatchewan, Canada. This constituency was created by the Representation Act, 2002 (Saskatchewan) out of the districts of Rosthern, Shellbrook-Spiritwood, and Redberry Lake.

The riding was last contested in the 2020 election, when incumbent Saskatchewan Party MLA and Premier Scott Moe was re-elected.

Communities in the district include the towns of Rosthern, Shellbrook, Hafford, Blaine Lake, and Spiritwood; and the villages of Canwood, Laird, Medstead, Leask, and Shell Lake.

History 
The constituency was first contested in the 2003 election, and has returned Saskatchewan Party members ever since, including the current premier (as of February 2, 2018), Scott Moe.

Members of the Legislative Assembly

Election results

|-

 
|NDP
|Clay DeBray
|align="right"|2,174
|align="right"|31.84
|align="right"|-3.67

|- bgcolor="white"
!align="left" colspan=3|Total
!align="right"|6,828
!align="right"|100.00
!align="right"|

|-

 
|NDP
|Ron Blocka
|align="right"|2,553
|align="right"|35.51
|align="right"|-1.03

|- bgcolor="white"
!align="left" colspan=3|Total
!align="right"|7,189
!align="right"|100.00
!align="right"|

References

External links 
Website of the Legislative Assembly of Saskatchewan
Saskatchewan Archives Board – Election Results by Electoral Division

Saskatchewan provincial electoral districts